Lévano is a surname. Notable people with the surname include:

 César Lévano (1926–2019), Peruvian journalist
 Delfín Lévano (1885–1941), Peruvian anarchist

Spanish-language surnames